In the fields of Big Bang theory and cosmology, reionization is the process that caused matter in the universe to reionize after the lapse of the "dark ages".

Reionization is the second of two major phase transitions of gas in the universe  (the first is recombination). While the majority of baryonic matter in the universe is in the form of hydrogen and helium, reionization usually refers strictly to the reionization of hydrogen, the element.

It is believed that the primordial helium also experienced the same phase of reionization changes, but at different points in the history of the universe. This is usually referred to as helium reionization.

Background 

The first phase change of hydrogen in the universe was recombination, which occurred at a redshift z = 1089 (379,000 years after the Big Bang), due to the cooling of the universe to the point where the rate of recombination of electrons and protons to form neutral hydrogen was higher than the reionization rate. The universe was opaque before the recombination, due to the scattering of photons (of all wavelengths) off free electrons (and free protons, to a significantly lesser extent), but it became increasingly transparent as more electrons and protons combined to form neutral hydrogen atoms. While the electrons of neutral hydrogen can absorb photons of some wavelengths by rising to an excited state, a universe full of neutral hydrogen will be relatively opaque only at those absorbed wavelengths, but transparent throughout most of the spectrum. The Dark Ages of the universe start at that point, because there were no light sources other than the gradually redshifting cosmic background radiation.

The second phase change occurred once objects started to condense in the early universe that were energetic enough to re-ionize neutral hydrogen. As these objects formed and radiated energy, the universe reverted from being composed of neutral atoms,  to once again being an ionized plasma. This occurred between 150 million and one billion years after the Big Bang (at a redshift 20 > z > 6). At that time, however, matter had been diffused by the expansion of the universe, and the scattering interactions of photons and electrons were much less frequent than before electron-proton recombination. Thus, the universe was full of low density ionized hydrogen and remained transparent, as is the case today.

Detection methods 
Looking back so far in the history of the universe presents some observational challenges. There are, however, a few observational methods for studying reionization.

Quasars and the Gunn-Peterson trough
One means of studying reionization uses the spectra of distant quasars. Quasars release an extraordinary amount of energy, in fact they are among the brightest objects in the universe. As a result, some quasars are detectable from as far back as the epoch of reionization. Quasars also happen to have relatively uniform spectral features, regardless of their position in the sky or distance from the Earth. Thus it can be inferred that any major differences between quasar spectra will be caused by the interaction of their emission with atoms along the line of sight. For wavelengths of light at the energies of one of the Lyman transitions of hydrogen, the scattering cross-section is large, meaning that even for low levels of neutral hydrogen in the intergalactic medium (IGM), absorption at those wavelengths is highly likely.

For nearby objects in the universe, spectral absorption lines are very sharp, as only photons with energies just sufficient to cause an atomic transition can cause that transition. However, the distances between quasars and the telescopes which detect them are large, which means that the expansion of the universe causes light to undergo noticeable redshifting. This means that as light from the quasar travels through the IGM and is redshifted, wavelengths which had been below the Lyman Alpha limit are stretched, and will in effect begin to fill in the Lyman absorption band. This means that instead of showing sharp spectral absorption lines, a quasar's light which has traveled through a large, spread out region of neutral hydrogen will show a Gunn-Peterson trough.

The redshifting for a particular quasar provides temporal (time) information about reionization. Since an object's redshift corresponds to the time at which it emitted the light, it is possible to determine when reionization ended. Quasars below a certain redshift (closer in space and time) do not show the Gunn-Peterson trough (though they may show the Lyman-alpha forest), while quasars emitting light prior to reionization will feature a Gunn-Peterson trough. In 2001, four quasars were detected (by the Sloan Digital Sky Survey) with redshifts ranging from z = 5.82 to z = 6.28. While the quasars above z = 6 showed a Gunn-Peterson trough, indicating that the IGM was still at least partly neutral, the ones below did not, meaning the hydrogen was ionized. As reionization is expected to occur over relatively short timescales, the results suggest that the universe was approaching the end of reionization at z = 6. This, in turn, suggests that the universe must still have been almost entirely neutral at z > 10.

CMB anisotropy and polarization

The anisotropy of the cosmic microwave background on different angular scales can also be used to study reionization. Photons undergo scattering when there are free electrons present, in a process known as Thomson scattering. However, as the universe expands, the density of free electrons will decrease, and scattering will occur less frequently. In the period during and after reionization, but before significant expansion had occurred to sufficiently lower the electron density, the light that composes the CMB will experience observable Thomson scattering. This scattering will leave its mark on the CMB anisotropy map, introducing secondary anisotropies (anisotropies introduced after recombination). The overall effect is to erase anisotropies that occur on smaller scales. While anisotropies on small scales are erased, polarization anisotropies are actually introduced because of reionization. By looking at the CMB anisotropies observed, and comparing with what they would look like had reionization not taken place, the electron column density at the time of reionization can be determined. With this, the age of the universe when reionization occurred can then be calculated.

The Wilkinson Microwave Anisotropy Probe allowed that comparison to be made. The initial observations, released in 2003, suggested that reionization took place from 30 > z > 11. This redshift range was in clear disagreement with the results from studying quasar spectra. However, the three year WMAP data returned a different result, with reionization beginning at z = 11 and the universe ionized by z = 7. This is in much better agreement with the quasar data.

Results in 2018 from Planck mission, yield an instantaneous reionization redshift of z = 7.68 ± 0.79.

The parameter usually quoted here is τ, the "optical depth to reionization," or alternatively, zre, the redshift of reionization, assuming it was an instantaneous event.  While this is unlikely to be physical, since reionization was very likely not instantaneous, zre provides an estimate of the mean redshift of reionization.

21-cm line
Even with the quasar data roughly in agreement with the CMB anisotropy data, there are still a number of questions, especially concerning the energy sources of reionization and the effects on, and role of, structure formation during reionization. The 21-cm line in hydrogen is potentially a means of studying this period, as well as the "dark ages" that preceded reionization. The 21-cm line occurs in neutral hydrogen, due to differences in energy between the spin triplet and spin singlet states of the electron and proton. This transition is forbidden, meaning it occurs extremely rarely. The transition is also highly temperature dependent, meaning that as objects form in the "dark ages" and emit Lyman-alpha photons that are absorbed and re-emitted by surrounding neutral hydrogen, it will produce a 21-cm line signal in that hydrogen through Wouthuysen-Field coupling. By studying 21-cm line emission, it will be possible to learn more about the early structures that formed. Observations from the Experiment to Detect the Global Epoch of Reionization Signature (EDGES) points to a signal from this era, although follow-up observations will be needed to confirm it. Several other projects hope to make headway in this area in the near future, such as the Precision Array for Probing the Epoch of Reionization (PAPER), Low Frequency Array (LOFAR), Murchison Widefield Array (MWA), Giant Metrewave Radio Telescope (GMRT), Mapper of the IGM Spin Temperature (MIST), the Dark Ages Radio Explorer (DARE) mission, and the Large-Aperture Experiment to Detect the Dark Ages (LEDA).

Energy sources

While observations have come in which narrow the window during which the epoch of reionization could have taken place, it is still uncertain which objects provided the photons that reionized the IGM. To ionize neutral hydrogen, an energy larger than 13.6 eV is required, which corresponds to photons with a wavelength of 91.2 nm or shorter. This is in the ultraviolet part of the electromagnetic spectrum, which means that the primary candidates are all sources which produce a significant amount of energy in the ultraviolet and above. How numerous the source is must also be considered, as well as the longevity, as protons and electrons will recombine if energy is not continuously provided to keep them apart. Altogether, the critical parameter for any source considered can be summarized as its "emission rate of hydrogen-ionizing photons per unit cosmological volume." With these constraints, it is expected that quasars and first generation stars and galaxies were the main sources of energy.

Dwarf galaxies 
Dwarf galaxies are currently the primary source of ionizing photons during the epoch of reionization. For most scenarios, this would require the log-slope of the UV galaxy luminosity function, often denoted α, to be steeper than it is today, approaching α = -2.

In 2014, two separate sources have identified two Green Pea galaxies (GPs) to be likely Lyman Continuum (LyC)-emitting candidates. This suggests that these two GPs are low-redshift analogs of high-redshift Lyman-alpha and LyC emitters, only two others of which are known: Haro 11 and Tololo-1247-232. Finding local LyC emitters is crucial to the theories about the early universe and the epoch of reionization. These two GPs have SDSS DR9 reference numbers: 1237661070336852109 (GP_J1219) and 1237664668421849521.

A new study shows that dwarf galaxies contributed nearly 30% of the ultraviolet light during the process of reionization. The dwarfs had such a big impact because a larger fraction of ionizing photons are able to escape dwarf galaxies (clocking in at 50%) as opposed to larger galaxies (clocking in at a mere 5%). Quoting J.H. Wise from an interview with Sky and Telescope: "The smallest galaxies first dominate at early times; however, they basically kill themselves off by blowing out their gas through their own supernovae and heating their environment. Afterwards, larger galaxies (but still much smaller than the Milky Way by about 100 times in mass) take over the job of reionizing the universe."

Quasars
Quasars, a class of active galactic nuclei (AGN), were considered a good candidate source because they are highly efficient at converting mass to energy, and emit a great deal of light above the threshold for ionizing hydrogen. It is unknown, however, how many quasars existed prior to reionization. Only the brightest of quasars present during reionization can be detected, which means there is no direct information about dimmer quasars that existed. However, by looking at the more easily observed quasars in the nearby universe, and assuming that the luminosity function (number of quasars as a function of luminosity) during reionization will be approximately the same as it is today, it is possible to make estimates of the quasar populations at earlier times. Such studies have found that quasars do not exist in high enough numbers to reionize the IGM alone, saying that "only if the ionizing background is dominated by low-luminosity AGNs can the quasar luminosity function provide enough ionizing photons."

Population III stars
 Population III stars were the earliest stars, which had no elements more massive than hydrogen or helium. During Big Bang nucleosynthesis, the only elements that formed aside from hydrogen and helium were trace amounts of lithium. Yet quasar spectra have revealed the presence of heavy elements in the intergalactic medium at an early era. Supernova explosions produce such heavy elements, so hot, large, Population III stars which will form supernovae are a possible mechanism for reionization. While they have not been directly observed, they are consistent according to models using numerical simulation and current observations. A gravitationally lensed galaxy also provides indirect evidence of Population III stars. Even without direct observations of Population III stars, they are a compelling source. They are more efficient and effective ionizers than Population II stars, as they emit more ionizing photons, and are capable of reionizing hydrogen on their own in some reionization models with reasonable initial mass functions. As a consequence, Population III stars are currently considered the most likely energy source to initiate the reionization of the universe, though other sources are likely to have taken over and driven reionization to completion.

Such stars are likely to have existed in the very early universe (i.e., at high redshift), and may have started the production of chemical elements heavier than hydrogen that are needed for the later formation of planets and life as we know it.

See also
 Big Bang
 Chronology of the universe
 Galaxies in the local universe that 'leak' Lyman continuum photons.
 Haro 11 - first of two galaxies
 Tololo-1247-232 - second of two galaxies
 List of the most distant astronomical objects
 Pea galaxy
 Quasars
 Strömgren sphere

Notes and references

External links
 End of the Dark Ages 
 LOFAR EoR, website of the group researching Epoch of Reionization using LOFAR.
 Official website of PAPER, the Precision Array for Probing the Epoch of Reionization
 Website of MIST, Mapper of the IGM Spin Temperature

Big Bang
Astrophysics
Space plasmas
Physical cosmology